Diane Lebouthillier   (born February 5, 1959) is a Canadian politician who has been the minister of national revenue since 2015. A member of the Liberal Party, Lebouthillier was elected to the House of Commons in the 2015 federal election and represents Gaspésie—Les Îles-de-la-Madeleine.

Background
Lebouthillier's parents were born in the Gaspé, and they returned when she was four. Prior to her career in politics, she was a local social worker, managing clients out of the CLSC in Chandler. She worked with long-time Member of the National Assembly (MNA) Georges Mamelonet on social service issues in the region. She is a mother of three sons and has two grandsons.

Political career 
Lebouthillier was elected in 2010 as the Prefect of Le Rocher-Percé Regional County Municipality.

Federal politics 
Lebouthillier was elected in the riding of Gaspésie—Les Îles-de-la-Madeleine during the 2015 federal election.

Minister of National Revenue 
Lebouthillier was appointed Minister of National Revenue in the federal Cabinet, headed by Justin Trudeau, on November 4, 2015.

Electoral record

References

External links
 Official Website
 Bio & mandate from the Prime Minister
 

Liberal Party of Canada MPs
Living people
Members of the House of Commons of Canada from Quebec
Women members of the House of Commons of Canada
Place of birth missing (living people)
Women mayors of places in Quebec
Mayors of places in Quebec
Canadian social workers
Université de Moncton alumni
Members of the King's Privy Council for Canada
Members of the 29th Canadian Ministry
Women government ministers of Canada
1959 births
21st-century Canadian women politicians
People from Gaspésie–Îles-de-la-Madeleine